General Sir John Edward Spencer Brind  (9 February 1878 – 14 October 1954) was a British Army officer who commanded the 4th Division.

Military career
Educated at Wellington College, Berkshire and the Royal Military Academy, Woolwich Brind was commissioned as a second lieutenant in the Royal Artillery in 1897. He served in the Second Boer War in South Africa 1899–1900, where he took part in operations in the Orange Free State, including engagements near Vet River and Sand River, and was promoted to the rank of Lieutenant on 23 December 1900. After the war, he was promoted to the rank of Captain on 11 April 1902, and served with the Native Mountain Artillery in India.

Following the outbreak of the First World War, which saw him attending the Staff College, Camberley as a student, Brind was sent to France as a captain with the Royal Garrison Artillery on 16 August 1914 and then served as a general staff officer with 56th (London) Division from 6 February 1916 to 31 October 1916. He then became a brigadier on the general staff of XI Corps, part of the Fifth Army.

After the War Brind became Deputy Director at the War Office in 1923, colonel Royal Artillery at Aldershot Command in 1925 and brigadier on the general staff at Aldershot Command in 1927. After becoming major-general, Royal Artillery in India in 1930, he went on to be Deputy Chief of the General Staff at Army Headquarters, India in 1931 and then General Officer Commanding 4th Division in 1933. His final appointments were as Commander-in-Chief, International Force in the Saar in 1934, Adjutant-General, India in 1936 and General Officer Commanding-in-Chief Southern Command in October 1937, serving in that role in the early years of the Second World War before retiring in 1941.

Retirement
In retirement Brind became Deputy Regional Commissioner for the North Eastern Region of England. He also wrote a Brind family history.

References

Sources
Official History 1918: Brigadier-General Sir James E. Edmonds, Military Operations France and Belgium, 1918 Volume V: 26 September – 11 November: The Advance to Victory 1947 (reprint Imperial War Museum, 1992).

|-

|-
 

1878 births
1954 deaths
British Army generals
People educated at Wellington College, Berkshire
Graduates of the Royal Military Academy, Woolwich
British Army generals of World War I
British Army generals of World War II
Royal Artillery officers
Knights Commander of the Order of the Bath
Knights Commander of the Order of the British Empire
Companions of the Order of St Michael and St George
Companions of the Distinguished Service Order
Graduates of the Staff College, Camberley
British Army personnel of the Second Boer War